Berndt Erik Egerbladh (May 1, 1932 – March 2, 2004) was a Swedish jazz pianist, composer and television personality.

Biography
Egerbladh was born in Transtrand. He grew up in Umeå and performed in local jazz and dance orchestras. He graduated as a teacher in 1954 and 1959, worked as such 1955–1967 and completed his education as a TV producer in 1969.

He was a producer at Swedish Radio's Channel 4 för Västerbotten 1967–1969, at Channel 2 television 1969–1985 and worked for SVT as a producer also hosting programs such as Två och en flygel (Two and a Grand Piano). He also published books, Remembering the 1940s and Remembering the 1950s, named for two TV series so titled along with one remembering the 1960s. He wrote the autobiographical "... och så tog Berndt bladet från munnen" (... and Then Berndt Spoke Out).

From 1985 he ran his own record companies "Green Records" and "Berndt Egerbladh produktion AB". Egerbladh also wrote, arranged and performed on Doris Svensson's record Did You Give the World Some Love Today Baby in 1970.

Han was the son of Ossian Egerbladh and Amy Egerbladh née Johansson (1900–1964) and an uncle of Birgitta Egerbladh. Berndt Egerbladh married Gunn-Britt Gunnarsson in 1955 and had daughters Monica and Ewa.

He died in Sollentuna, Sweden.

Discography
Fanfar 1962
Schizo 1964
But When I Started to Play 1966
Plays the Organ with a Swing 1968
Snövit Och Dom Sju Dvärgarna - En popmusical 1973
Nybyggarland 1973
Kristallen den fina 1974
African Suite 1975
Var mig nära 1975
Ja visst gör det ont 1976
As time goes by 1984 with Palle Danielsson andh Johan Norberg
Live at Borgholm Strand 1985
A Boy Full of Thoughts 1989
Twosome 1992-1996
Night pieces 1992
Mousse au Chocolat 2001
Sweet & Lovely 2002

Selected movie scores
1971 Exponerad
1973 Håll alla dörrar öppna
1975 A Guy and a Gal
1975 Pojken med guldbyxorna
1979 Gå på vattnet om du kan
1981 Peter No-Tail

Selected television
1974-1990 - Två och en flygel
1989 - Jag minns mitt 40-tal
1988 - Jag minns mitt 50-tal
1993 - Jag minns mitt 60-tal

Bibliography
Egerbladh, Berndt (1991). Jag minns mitt 40-tal. Höganäs: Bra böcker.
Egerbladh, Berndt (1992). Jag minns mitt 50-tal. Höganäs: Bra böcker.

References
Vem är det : Svensk biografisk handbok 1999, Ed. Elisabeth Gafvelin, Kunskapsförlaget P. A. Norstedt & Söners Förlag, Stockholm 1998  ISSN 0347-3341 s. 251
Berndt Egerbladh - pianist, organist, kompositör, producent och programledare i television och radio from Orkesterjournalen

External links
Berndt Egerbladh at Svensk mediedatabas

1932 births
2004 deaths
20th-century Swedish male musicians